Reed's Mill is a historic grist mill and national historic district located at Secondcreek, Monroe County, West Virginia.  The district includes two contributing buildings and eight contributing structures. It was one of the original mill complexes of Secondcreek.  The main mill building was built about 1791, and is a mortise and tenon frame structure held together with wooden pins, and sits atop a raised cut stone basement. A tall three-story section with basement was added in 1949.  The district also includes the mill dam, wing-dam, mill race lined with rock and ending in the mill pond, and concrete mill race that carries water to the turbine (1872) which operates the grinding wheels in the mill.  It remains an operating mill.

It was listed on the National Register of Historic Places in 1993.

References

Grinding mills on the National Register of Historic Places in West Virginia
Historic districts on the National Register of Historic Places in West Virginia
Industrial buildings completed in 1914
Buildings and structures in Monroe County, West Virginia
National Register of Historic Places in Monroe County, West Virginia
Historic districts in Monroe County, West Virginia
Grinding mills in West Virginia